A reciprocating saw is a type of machine-powered saw in which the cutting action is achieved through a push-and-pull ("reciprocating") motion of the blade. The original trade name Sawzall is often used in the United States, where Milwaukee Electric Tool first produced a tool of this type in 1951.

The term is commonly applied to a type of saw used in construction and demolition work. This type of saw, also known as a hognose or recip saw, has a large blade resembling that of a jigsaw and a handle oriented to allow the saw to be used comfortably on vertical surfaces. The typical design of this saw has a foot at the base of the blade, similar to that of a jigsaw. The user holds or rests this foot on the surface being cut so that the tendency of the blade to push away from or pull towards the cut as the blade travels through its movement can be countered.

Design 
Designs range widely in power, speed, and features, from less powerful portable, handheld models that are usually shaped like a cordless drill, to high-power, high-speed, corded models designed for heavy construction and demolition work. Modern reciprocating saws almost all have variable speed, either through trigger sensitivity or through a dial. Another feature that has become important to the way these saws are used is the inclusion of an orbital action. This action consists of oscillating the traversed reciprocation in up and down fashion (perpendicular to the motion of cut) causing the tip of the blade to move in an oval pattern, up and down as well as back and forth. This feature is primarily for wood, allowing quick cuts.

A reciprocating saw is a popular tool used by many window fitters, construction workers and emergency rescue services. Variants and accessories are available for specialized uses, such as clamps and long blades for cutting large pipe.

Blades are available for a variety of materials and uses. Common types include metal cutting blades, wood cutting blades, blades for composites, for drywall, and other materials. Many of these blade types have a variety of tooth designs intended for special purposes, such as tree-limb cutting, demolition work, clean cutting, or contaminated materials. Abrasive coated blades are also available for hard materials like tile and stone.

The term reciprocating saw (also oscillating saw) is also applied generically to any saw which cuts with a back and forth motion. These include:

 Jigsaw
 Scroll saw
 Sabre saw
 Rotary reciprocating saw

Powered reciprocating tools are also found in surgery and dental surgery, where they are used in operations that require cutting or grinding of bone.

Mechanism 

The reciprocating action may be produced in several ways. A crank or Scotch yoke type drive may be used, a swashplate type drive, a captive cam or eccentric, barrel cam, or other rotary to linear drive. Modern tools are built with variants of all of these mechanisms. Eccentric cam, crank and scotch yoke drives need balance weights to reduce vibration in the plane of the rotating element, and may still exhibit vibration that is objectionable to a user of a handheld saw and can lead to difficulty in controlling a cut. The swash plate drive has the advantage that there is little rotational out of balance, so the principal vibration is in line with the blade. This is generally controllable by keeping the foot of a handheld tool against the work.

See also 

 Power hacksaw

References

External links 
 NIOSH Sound Power and Vibrations Database 
 New York City Construction Quiet Vendor Guidelines 

Saws
Woodworking hand-held power tools